US Monastir may refer to:
 US Monastir (basketball), basketball section of the multi-sports club
 US Monastir (football), football section of the multi-sports club